Taranga or Tharanga is a major Kannada weekly family interest magazine, published in Karnataka, India, which has its headquarters in Manipal, Karnataka.

Taranga covers topics such as short stories, poems, serialized fiction, spirituality, health, travel and technology, cookery, fashion, beauty, film news, sports, culture etc. It publishes cartoons too, on politics society.

For the past 15 years, Sandhya Pai has been the Managing editor, of the magazine.

History 
Taranga was launched on trial on 28 November 1982 in Manipal, and had its official launch on 2 January 1983. The inaugural price of the first edition was ₹1.50.

Sister publications 
 Roopatara, a Kannada monthly film magazine
 Tunturu, a Kannada bi-monthly children magazine
 Tushara, a Kannada monthly literary magazine
 Udayavani, a Kannada daily newspaper

See also 
 List of Kannada-language magazines
 Media in Karnataka
 Media of India

References 

1983 establishments in Karnataka
Weekly magazines published in India
Kannada-language magazines
Magazines established in 1983
Mass media in Bangalore